Biegel may refer to:

People
 Anton Biegel, Austrian slalom canoeist
 Erwin Biegel (1896–1954), German stage and film actor
 Kevin Biegel, television writer/producer
 Paul Biegel (1925–2006), Dutch author
 Vince Biegel (born 1993), American American football player

Places
 , Germany

See also
 Bagel